Omar Hassan Jama (born 21 May 1998) is a footballer who plays as a midfielder for Ykkönen side IF Gnistan. Born in Finland, he represents Somalia internationally.

Club career
Jama joined PS Kemi in January 2017 from Kakkonen side Klubi 04. In 2019, Jama joined Ekenäs IF for a season, before moving to IF Gnistan the following year.

International career
After representing Finland on junior levels, in 2021 he was called up to the Somalia national football team and made his debut on 20 June 2021 in an Arab Cup qualifier against Oman.

Career statistics

References

External links
 Omar Jama at UEFA

1998 births
Living people
Finnish footballers
Finland youth international footballers
People with acquired Somali citizenship
Somalian footballers
Somalia international footballers
Association football midfielders
Helsingin Jalkapalloklubi players
Klubi 04 players
Kemi City F.C. players
Vaasan Palloseura players
Ekenäs IF players
Kakkonen players
Veikkausliiga players
Ykkönen players
Finnish people of Somali descent
Footballers from Helsinki
IF Gnistan players